Steamboat Bill, Jr. is a 1928 silent comedy film starring Buster Keaton. Released by United Artists, the film is the final product of Keaton's independent production team and set of gag writers. It was not a box-office success and became the last picture Keaton made for United Artists. Keaton ended up moving to Metro-Goldwyn-Mayer, where he made one last film in his trademark style, The Cameraman, before his creative control was taken away by the studio.

Charles Reisner directed the film, and the credited story writer was Carl Harbaugh. The film, named after Arthur Collins's popular 1911 recording of the 1910 song "Steamboat Bill", also featured Ernest Torrence, Marion Byron, and Tom Lewis. The film is known for what may be Keaton's most famous film stunt: The facade of a house falls around him while he stands in the precise location of an open window to avoid being flattened.

In 2016, the film was selected for preservation in the United States National Film Registry by the Library of Congress.

Plot

William "Steamboat Bill" Canfield is the owner and captain of a paddle steamer, the Stonewall Jackson, that has seen better days. A new steamer the King owned by J J King is stealing all his customers. King also owns the local bank and the town hotel. At a well-attended launch party, he belittles the Stonewall Jackson. Bill receives a telegram saying his son is arriving on the 10am train, having finished his studies in Boston. Bill has not seen him for many years.

King's daughter Kitty arrives home from college to visit him. She drives a swanky car.

Bill waits at the train station, expecting a big, husky man like himself to get off. He inspects all men getting off but none wear a white carnation which Bill Jr said he would wear. Junior got off on the wrong side. He then goes down the platform pointing his carnation at everyone in turn. Bill Senior and his assistant have given up when they read a luggage tag on a bag reading "William Canfield Jr, Boston". They have found the right man. William is deepy disappointed with his slight, awkward offspring, who shows up with a pencil moustache, a ukulele, and wearing a foppish beret. He sends him to the barber to have the moustache removed and there he bumps into his college friend Kitty. They (father and son) then go to the hat shop to choose a new hat. After much selection, the chosen hat blows off as soon as he leaves the shop, and he reverts to the beret.

Down at the riverside they meet King and his daughter. Bill is embarrassed by his son and sends him to get some working clothes. He gets kitted out as a naval officer (which is not what Bill wanted). Bill's assistant quips "no jury would convict you". On board Bill Jr is awkward. He knocks off a life belt (which instantly sinks). He sees Kitty on the dock talking to a handsome officer off the King. But she runs off when taken onto the King and goes to the Stonewall Jackson instead...to see Junior. Her dad orders her back. Junior ends up getting pushed to and fro between ships. Junior is sent to the engine room to see how the ship works. He pulls a lever making the ship crash into the King.

Both Bill and King are determined to break up the relationship between Junior and Kitty, but at night, Junior slips off and boards the King. As the ships are further apart than before he uses a plank to cross. The King starts moving but the plank does not fall as it is jammed on one side. Junior walks off the end of the plank.

Junior decides to go back to Boston but changes his mind and rips up the ticket.

When Canfield's ship is condemned as unsafe, he accuses King of orchestrating it. He assaults his enemy and is then put in jail. On a very wet and windy day his son tries to free him by bringing him a huge loaf of bread with tools hidden inside, but father refuses the bread, especially when Junior says he made it himself. Junior tries to signal to Bill what the plan is and Bill then says he wants the bread. But the tools fall out. Junior says the dough fell in the tool chest. The sheriff gets knocked out and locked in the cell where Bill was. Bill runs off but Junior's coat gets stuck in the cell door. He accidentally releases the sheriff, who hits Canfield Jr. on the head with his revolver, sending him to the hospital.

Then a cyclone hits, tearing down buildings and endangering the ships. A pier collapses and the King breaks loose. The King Hotel collapses. The walls disappear from the hospital leaving Junior exposed. As Canfield Jr. makes his way through the town, a building front falls all around him, as an unbroken facade and Junior fits through the open window (an infamous stunt). Several buildings collapse dangerously close. Then he is blown in the air clinging to the tree and lands in the river. The jail blows off its foundations and starts to sink. He reaches his father's ship and a house floats by with Kitty on its side. He rescues Kitty with her full weight hanging as he crosses on a rope, then he sees his father floating down in the jail which is sinking lower and lower. He devises a set of ropes to pull the power lever downstairs while he steers and rams the ship into the sinking jail, splitting it open to release his father. Next they see Kitty's father: the King has sunk and he is in the river. Junior ties himself to a rope and dives in to rescue him. When Kitty goes to her hero, she is puzzled when William jumps into the water. However, his purpose becomes clear when he returns, towing a minister in a lifebelt.

Cast

 Buster Keaton as William Canfield, Jr.
 Ernest Torrence as William "Steamboat Bill" Canfield, Sr.
 Marion Byron as Kitty King
 Tom McGuire as John James King
 Tom Lewis as Tom Carter
 Joe Keaton as the barber

Production
The original idea for the film came from Charlie Chaplin-collaborator Charles Reisner, who was the director. Keaton, who had directed or co-directed many of his earlier films, was an uncredited co-director on this project. In June 1927, he traveled to Sacramento, California, and spent over $100,000 building sets, including a pier. Original plans called for an ending with a flood sequence, but due to the devastating 1927 Mississippi River Flood, producer Joseph Schenck forced him to cut the arrangement. Keaton also spent an additional $25,000 for the cyclone scene, which included breakaway street sets and six powerful Liberty-motor wind machines. The cyclone scene cost one-third of the film's entire budget, estimated at between $300,000 and $404,282. Keaton himself, who planned and performed his own stunts, was suspended on a cable from the crane, which hurled him from place to place as if airborne.

Shooting began on July 15, 1927, in Sacramento. Production was delayed when Keaton broke his nose in a baseball game. The film includes his most famous stunt: an entire building facade collapsing all around him. The open attic window fits neatly around Keaton's body as it falls, coming within inches of flattening him. He had performed a similar, though less elaborate, stunt in his earlier short films Back Stage (1919) and One Week (1920). He used a genuine, two-ton building facade and no trickery. The mark on the ground showing Keaton exactly where to stand to avoid being crushed was a nail. It has been claimed that if he had stood just inches off the correct spot, he would have been seriously injured or killed. His third wife, Eleanor, suggested that he took such risks due to despair over financial problems, his failing first marriage, the imminent loss of his filmmaking independence, and recklessness due to his worsening alcohol abuse at the time. Evidence that Keaton was suicidal, is scant—he was known throughout his career for performing dangerous stunts independent of any difficulties in his personal life, including a fall from a railroad water tower tube in 1924's Sherlock Jr. in which his neck was fractured. He later said, "I was mad at the time, or I would never have done the thing." He also said that filming the shot was one of his greatest thrills.

It is one of the few Keaton films to reference his fame. At the time of filming, he had stopped wearing his trademark pork pie hat with a short flat crown. During an early scene in which his character tries on a series of hats (something that was copied several times in other films), a clothing salesman briefly puts the trademark cap on his head, but he quickly rejects it, tossing it away.

At the end of shooting, Schenck announced the dissolution of Buster Keaton Productions.

Reception
Steamboat Bill, Jr. was a box office failure and received mixed reviews upon its release. Variety described the film as "a pip of a comedy" and "one of Keaton's best." The reviewer from The Film Spectator appointed it "as perhaps the best comedy of the year thus far" and advised, "exhibitors should go after it." A less enthusiastic review from Harrison's Reports stated, "there are many situations all the way through that cause laughs" while noting that "the plot is nonsensical." Mordaunt Hall of the New York Times called the film a "gloomy comedy" and a "sorry affair."

Over the years, Steamboat Bill, Jr. has become regarded as a masterpiece of its era. On Rotten Tomatoes 100% of critics have given the film a positive rating based on 30 reviews, with an average score of 9.00/10. The film was included in the book 1001 Movies You Must See Before You Die.

Legacy
The film inspired the title of Walt Disney's Steamboat Willie (1928), which was released six months later and is considered the debut of Mickey Mouse.

The famous falling house stunt has been re-created several times on film and television (although with lighter materials and more contemporary safety measures in place) including the 1975 The Goodies episode The Movies, the 1991 MacGyver episode "Deadly Silents"; Jackie Chan's Project A Part II; the 2004 Arrested Development episode "The One Where They Build a House" (performed by the show's character named Buster); Al Yankovic's music video Amish Paradise (cross-referencing Peter Weir's 1985 film Witness); the 2006 comedy film Jackass Number Two; an Australian home insurance TV advertisement in 2021; and episode 7 in the first season of Lucha Underground, with a ladder.

Deadpan, a 1997 work by English film artist and director Steve McQueen, was also inspired by Steamboat Bill, Jr. McQueen stands in Keaton's place as a house facade falls over him. This film was shot from multiple angles, and the scene repeats over and over again while McQueen stands seemingly unaffected.

George Miller's "The Witches of Eastwick" film from 1987 references the scene where crates are blown all over Buster during the cyclone when Jack Nicholson gets debris (including boxes) blown over him in the windstorm sequence towards the end.  The shot from the Keaton film is also seen in one of the multiple TVs in the media room in the final scene.

See also
 Buster Keaton filmography
 The Wind, 1928 movie starring Lillian Gish
 The Fantastic Flying Books of Mr. Morris Lessmore
 Volga-Volga

Notes

Bibliography

External links

 
 
 
 
 Steamboat Bill, Jr. at the International Buster Keaton Society
  Choice clips from this Public Domain classic (in Windows and Real Media format)

1928 comedy films
1928 films
1920s adventure comedy films
1920s American films
American adventure comedy films
American black-and-white films
American silent feature films
Articles containing video clips
Films about father–son relationships
Films directed by Buster Keaton
Films directed by Charles Reisner
Films produced by Joseph M. Schenck
Films set on boats
Films shot in Sacramento, California
United Artists films
United States National Film Registry films
Silent American comedy films
Silent adventure films